A headlight is a device used to light the road ahead of a vehicle.

Headlight or headlamp may also refer to:

Lights
 Headlamp (outdoor), a mobile lighting device fastened to a person's head for outdoor activities
 Carbide lamp, a type of lamp that produces and burns acetylene, created by the reaction of calcium carbide with water, previously used for vehicle headlamps

Software
 Headlight Software, software developer and creator of the GetRight download manager

Music
 Headlights (band), an indie rock band from Champaign, Illinois, United States that formed in 2004, active until at least 2009

Albums
Headlights, album by The Whispers

Songs
"Headlights" (Cat Power song) 1993 song reissued on the album Dear Sir, 1995
"Headlights" (Eminem song), a song by Eminem from his album The Marshall Mathers LP 2, 2013
"Headlights" (Montgomery Gentry song), 2014
"Headlights" (Robin Schulz song), 2015
"Headlights", song by Lloyd Cole from Plastic Wood, 2001 	
"Headlights", song by Driver 67, 1979
"Headlights", song by Sean Lennon from Friendly Fire, 2006 	
"Headlights", song by Beverly Ross, B-side to "Stop Laughing At Me", 1958
"Headlights", song by New Model Army from Strange Brotherhood, 1998
"Headlights", song by Nine Black Alps from Everything Is, 2005
"Headlights", song by the Michael Stanley Band, B-side to "Poor Side Of Town", 1986
"Headlights", song by Thieves (band), B-side to "400 Dragons", 1979
"Headlights", song by The Whispers, B-side to "(Let's Go) All The Way", 1978